The 1997 Copa América Final was the final match of the 38th edition of the Copa America tournament. The match was held on 29 June 1997, in Estadio Hernando Siles Stadium at La Paz, Bolivia. Brazil won the match against hosts Bolivia by a 3–1 score. This was the fifth Copa América clinched by Brazil and their first Copa América trophy outside their home nation.

Route to the final

Match details

|}

References

Final, 1997 Copa America
 
Brazil national football team matches
Bolivia national football team matches
Copa América finals
Copa America
Sports competitions in La Paz
20th century in La Paz
June 1997 sports events in South America